KGBS-CD, virtual channel and UHF digital channel 19, is a low-powered, Class A Stadium-affiliated television station licensed to Austin, Texas, United States. The station is owned by HC2 Holdings.

History
The station was built and signed on by local Austin businessman Juan Wheeler Jr., and was at first an independent station, affiliated with the Telemundo network. K65GB was financed by funds from KVAW, the Wheeler-owned Telemundo station in Eagle Pass. In 2001, Caballero Television, a television broadcasting company run by Eduardo Caballero, acquired KGBS-LP; the station became affiliated with Más Música, a network that Caballero also owned, which broadcast Spanish music videos 24 hours a day. In December 2005, Viacom acquired Más Música and ten of the network's affiliated stations, including KGBS. The sale was finalized in January 2006, when Más Música became MTV Tres. In 2014, CNZ Communications reached a deal to purchase KGBS from Viacom, and the sale was finalized in 2015. Shortly after the sale and the conversion to digital television, KGBS dropped the MTV Tres affiliation and began showing all infomercials once again on its main channel. The station also added subchannels with additional programming.

Digital channels
The station's digital signal is multiplexed:

References

External links

Antenna TV affiliates
GBS-CD
Television channels and stations established in 1994
Low-power television stations in the United States
Innovate Corp.